Paul Alexander Wijnberg (19 December 1934 - 2 July 2013) was a senior South African naval officer.

Early life
He was schooled at Maritzburg College,

When he returned to South Africa he was appointed Officer Commanding  Gunnery School.

He married Mary Wijnberg and had Mike, Allan, John and Simon Wijnberg

In 1973 he was posted to France as Naval Attache, for which he was awarded the Ordre Nationale de Mérite.

He commanded the frigate  and in 1976 took part in the  Bicentennial Celebrations.

He was appointed Flag Officer Naval Command East and promoted to the rank of Rear Admiral.

He retired in 1998 to a farm in Grabouw on chosen farm. He died on 2 July 2013.

References

South African admirals
1934 births
2013 deaths
Alumni of Maritzburg College
Recipients of the Ordre national du Mérite